China National Highway 320 (G320) runs southwest from Shanghai through the provinces of Zhejiang, Jiangxi, Hunan and Guizhou before ending in Ruili, Yunnan at the Sino–Burmese border.

Route and distance

References

See also 

 China National Highways

Road transport in Shanghai
Transport in Zhejiang
Transport in Jiangxi
Transport in Hunan
Transport in Guizhou
Transport in Yunnan
320